A Remark Hugh Made is a studio album by Hugh Hopper and Kramer, released in 1994 by Shimmy Disc.

Track listing

Personnel 
Adapted from A Remark Hugh Made liner notes.

Musicians
Bill Bacon – drums, percussion
Hugh Hopper – bass guitar
Randolph A. Hudson III – guitar
Kramer – vocals, slide guitar, piano, organ, mellotron, percussion, production, engineering, bass guitar (3)
Gary Windo – tenor saxophone, vocals

Additional musicians
Robert Wyatt – lead vocals (1)
Production and additional personnel
DAM – design
Michael Macioce – photography
Steve Watson – assistant producer, assistant engineer

Release history

References

External links 
 A Remark Hugh Made at Discogs (list of releases)

1994 albums
Collaborative albums
Albums produced by Kramer (musician)
Hugh Hopper albums
Kramer (musician) albums
Shimmy Disc albums